James Ronald Walker (June 28, 1947 – June 2, 2022) was an American politician. He served as a Democratic member for the 19th district of the Georgia State Senate.

Life and career 
Walker was born in Telfair County, Georgia, the son of Hilda White and James Wimbric Walker. He attended Georgia Southwestern State University.

In 1977, Walker was elected to represent the 19th district of the Georgia State Senate. He served until 1984, when he was succeeded by Walter S. Ray. He was sheriff of Telfair County, Georgia, where he served from 1895 until December 31, 1992.
Walker was suspected of part owning a cockfighting gambling enterprise and of accepting bribes from cocaine dealers and other criminal.
In 1994 Walker was found guilty of conspiring to manufacture, possess and distribute marijuana and was sentence to serve ten years in prison.

Walker died in June 2022, at the age of 74 and was survived by his wife Dianne Marchant Walker, 2 children and 2 step children.

References 

1947 births
2022 deaths
People from Telfair County, Georgia
Democratic Party Georgia (U.S. state) state senators
20th-century American politicians
Georgia Southwestern State University alumni
Georgia (U.S. state) sheriffs